Jim Miller (born 1955) is an American film editor.  Along with Paul Rubell, Miller was nominated for an Academy Award for Best Film Editing for the film Collateral (directed by Michael Mann – 2004).

A native of Chicago, Miller began his film career as an editor and then producer of television commercials and industrial films. He later moved to Los Angeles, where he began editing such television films as Alice in Wonderland and Two Fathers.

Miller's first screen credit was for The Breakfast Club (directed by John Hughes – 1985); he was the associate editor for the distinguished, veteran film editor Dede Allen. Miller's first three editing credits were also for films co-edited by Allen, commencing with The Milagro Beanfield War (directed by Robert Redford – 1988). Following Let It Ride (directed by Joe Pytka – 1989), he and Allen co-edited The Addams Family (1991), which was directed by Barry Sonnenfeld. Miller then worked (without Allen) as the editor for five more of Sonnenfeld's films, including Men in Black (1997) and Wild Wild West (1999).

In addition to their Academy Award nomination, Miller and Rubell's editing of Collateral was honored by nominations for the ACE Eddie Award, BAFTA Award for Best Editing, and the Satellite Award for Best Editing, which they won.

References

External links

American film editors
Living people
Artists from Chicago
1955 births